Furnace Mountain (temple name Kwan Se Um San Ji Sah) is an American Zen Buddhist retreat center in Clay City, Kentucky, co-founded in 1986 by Seung Sahn Soen Sa Nim and Dae Gak Soen Sa Nim as part of the international Kwan Um School of Zen; it is now unaffiliated with the school in an official capacity. In 1990 the main Meditation Hall was completed, and in 1994 the temple was constructed and opened. Kwan Se Um San Ji Sah is modeled after a traditional Korean Buddhist Temple—located on 850 acres (263 ha) of woods in part of The Daniel Boone National Forest (in The Red River Gorge area). The exact site of Kwan Se Um San Ji Sah was determined by the use of geomantic divination, which was intended to help foster harmony. The Abbot and guiding teacher is Dae Gak Zen Master.

Gallery

See also
Buddhism in the United States
Timeline of Zen Buddhism in the United States

Notes

References

External links

Furnace Mountain website

Buddhist temples in the United States
Kwan Um School of Zen
Buildings and structures in Powell County, Kentucky
Seon temples
Buddhism in Kentucky
Zen centers in the United States
Religious buildings and structures in Kentucky
Tourist attractions in Powell County, Kentucky
Asian-American culture in Kentucky